Swynnerton is an English surname. Notable people with the surname include:

Annie Swynnerton, English painter
Charles Francis Massy Swynnerton, English naturalist
Humphrey Swynnerton, English politician
Sir John de Swynnerton, English law enforcement official (14th century)
John de Swynnerton, English law enforcement official (14th century)
Sir John Swynnerton, English politician and merchant taylor
John Swynnerton (c.1349-c.1427), English politician (and maybe law enforcement official (14th century))
John Swynnerton, English law enforcement official (16th century)
Margaret Swynnerton, daughter of Humphrey that married into the Vernon family of Sudbury and Hilton

See also
Swynnerton Hall
Swinnerton

English-language surnames
Lists of people by surname